Ponam may be,

Ponam Island
Ponam language, spoken on the island

See also
PONAM